Conrad Keven Chase (born June 9, 1965 in Portland, Maine) is an actor, singer/songwriter and public speaker.

History
Conrad participated in Spain's Gran Hermano (Big Brother). He was also a member of a Dutch boy band known as the Baja Boys. He released a summer hit in 2004 in Spain called "La Gosadera" together with Juanjo Rocamora, winner of Spain's 2004 Gran Hermano 6. He also was a featuring artist on a hit single "No te quiero mas" together with Las Latinas in 2006.

After serving three years in the U.S. Army Signal Corps as a Telecommunications Center Operator (1983–1986) Conrad studied Electronics Technology at the Southern Maine Technical College for two years.

Conrad is also known for implementing a system which allowed guests at his night clubs to be implanted with RFID chips. Customers who carry the chip are allowed access to the VIP area. The system also allows patrons to pay for drinks just by being scanned. It was the first time that RFID technology had been used for this purpose. The idea has been featured in the TV series CSI: Miami and in the series Moonlight.

TV shows
 Tele5 - Gran Hermano 6–Finalista (2004)
 Tele5 - A tu Lado
 Tele5 - Crónicas marcianas
 Tele5 - Ana Rosa
 City TV–ArusCity
 City TV–Vitamina N
 TV–Toni Rovira y tu
 Canal Latino–Conrad & Friends
 Canal Catalá - Condició Femenina
 Canal Catalá - Estat de Choc
 Tele5 - Aquí Hay Tomate
 FlaixTV–La Nit
 RTL5–Way of Life (Holanda)
 SBS6–Mike Stading Show (Holanda)
 Veronica–Trend Setters (Holanda)
 RNN7–Night Life Guide (Holanda)
 TMF–Tot Fabienne (Holanda)
 CNN–Technology (International)
 BBC–High Technology (International)

Movies
 Plankton, Largometraje en fase de producción - Actor
 The Loop, Corto de terror en fase de rodaje–Actor
 Mi Padre–Actor (2007)

Music (CDs)
 Disco Estrella 2007, song: "No te quiero mas"–Singer
 Filmax 50 Grados 2005, song: "La Gossadera"–Singer
 Filmax 50 Grados 2005 video clip "La Gossadera"–Actor
 The Baja Boys "You to me are everything" - Singer, choreographer (1999)
 The Baja Boys "Celebration" - Singer (1998)

Conrad speaks: English, Spanish and Dutch.

References
Clubbers choose chip implants to jump queues

External links
 

Male actors from Portland, Maine
American singer-songwriters
American male singer-songwriters
Musicians from Portland, Maine
1965 births
Living people
Southern Maine Community College alumni
Songwriters from Maine